Calder Park is a suburb in Melbourne, Victoria, Australia,  north-west of Melbourne's Central Business District, located within the City of Brimbank local government area. Calder Park recorded no population at the 2021 census.

Wedged between the Calder Freeway and the Bendigo railway line, Calder Park has no residential dwellings within its bounds, with the chapel being the only structure, situated adjacent to the Calder Park Raceway. This is located in the northern half of the suburb, with the southern half comprising open fields and the adjoining Taylors Lakes.

The land located between the raceway and Taylors Lakes is zoned for future industrial use and is shown in some maps as a future industrial estate. The development type is restricted due to its proximity to Melbourne Airport and its planned future second runway project.

See also
 City of Keilor – Calder Park was previously within this former local government area.

References

Suburbs of Melbourne
Suburbs of the City of Brimbank